NGC 3938 is an unbarred spiral galaxy in the Ursa Major constellation. It was discovered on 6 February 1788 by William Herschel.  It is one of the brightest spiral galaxies in the Ursa Major South galaxy group and is roughly 67,000 light years in diameter. It is approximately 43 million light years away from Earth. NGC 3938 is classified as type Sc under the Hubble sequence, a loosely wound spiral galaxy with a smaller and dimmer bulge. The spiral arms of the galaxy contain many areas of ionized atomic hydrogen gas, more so towards the center.

Three supernovae have been identified within NGC 3938. SN 2005ay is a type II supernova that was discovered on 27 March 2005 and had a magnitude of 15.6. SN 2017ein is a type Ic supernova that was discovered on 25 May 2017 and peaked at magnitude 14.9. Images taken before the explosion  point to a progenitor mass between ~47-48, if it was in a single star system, and ~60-80, if it was in a binary star system.  SN 2022xlp is a type Ia supernova that was discovered on 13 October 2022 by Koichi Itagaki.

Gallery

References

External links 
 

Ursa Major (constellation)
Unbarred spiral galaxies
3938
17880206
Ursa Major Cluster
037229